FC Bataysk-2007 was a Russian association football club from Bataysk, founded in 1998 and playing on the professional level since 2007 until 2010. On July 31, 2010 it dropped out from the Russian Second Division due to lack of finances. From 1998 to 2006 it was called FC Bataysk.

External links
Official website

Association football clubs established in 1998
Association football clubs disestablished in 2010
Defunct football clubs in Russia
Sport in Rostov Oblast
1998 establishments in Russia
2010 disestablishments in Russia